Sailly-Saillisel is a commune in the Somme department in Hauts-de-France in northern France.

Geography

History
 Theatre of operations of the Battle of Bapaume during the Franco-Prussian War of 1870–71.
 Theatre of operations of the Battle of the Somme during the First World War of 1914–1918.

Population

See also
Communes of the Somme department

References

Communes of Somme (department)